Lore Olympus is a romance webcomic created by New Zealand artist Rachel Smythe. The comic is a modern retelling of the relationship between the Greek goddess and god Persephone and Hades. It began publishing weekly on the platform Webtoon in March 2018. Lore Olympus is currently the most popular comic on Webtoon; as of January 2023, it has 1.2 billion views and 6.2 million subscribers. The comic has won a Harvey Award, an Eisner Award, and received nominations for a Ringo Award. It was announced in 2019 that a television adaptation was under development.

Plot and themes 
Lore Olympus is an adaptation of the classic Greek myth The Abduction of Persephone in a mostly modern setting. The webcomic includes modern technology such as smartphones, sports cars, and tabloids. However, scenes in the realm of the mortals take place in the time of the original myths. The comic deals with strong themes of rape, harassment, abuse, and trauma.

The story begins with Hades attending a party of his brother, Zeus's, after his partner, Minthe, stood him up. Persephone has been allowed to leave the mortal realm and study at university at Olympus by her mother, Demeter. Hades takes notice of Persephone at the party, and comments to his brothers, Zeus and Poseidon that Persephone's beauty rivals that of Aphrodite. Out of jealousy, Aphrodite calls her son, Eros, to get Persephone extremely intoxicated, and they leave her in the back seat of Hades' car in an attempt to have her embarrass herself in front of him. After their initial encounter from this incident, Hades and Persephone both express an interest in each other, but Persephone still struggles with her emotions, due an earlier plot point that happened in the comic–she was raped by Apollo. Aside from this rape being traumatizing, she struggles with her current association of being a prospective member and a recipient of an academic scholarship from The Goddesses of Eternal Maidenhood (TGOEM), a group of sacred virgin goddesses that consists of Artemis, Athena, and Hestia.

Plots in season one of the webcomic include Persephone seeking Hades' help to bring back friends who died when mortals uprooted sacred plants; a scheme by Minthe, Thanatos and Thetis to ruin Persephone's reputation; the rape of Persephone by Apollo; and Persephone's conflicted thoughts over a college scholarship that requires her to refrain from sex.

Plots in season two include Persephone going missing, the abduction of Persephone, and Hades and Persephone's growing relationship.

Characters

The following characters are central to plot lines in the comic and make regular appearances:

Persephone is the goddess of Spring, Queen of the Underworld, and wife of Hades; she is depicted as a young pink woman, and, briefly in later chapters, has green hands. She is a naive, warmhearted newcomer to the Olympian life, and is searching for her independence. Persephone is 19–20 years old (she turned 20 in episode 107 and is later 30 in episode 192). She has prehensile hair which responds to her emotions at varying levels, sometimes by growing or sprouting flowers. She strives to become self-sufficient and to maintain a positive, hard-working attitude. While a kind, caring, and somewhat naive individual, Persephone also unintentionally massacred a mortal village for unknowingly uprooting her handmaidens, the sacred flower nymphs. Persephone was originally a candidate and unofficial member of the Goddesses of Eternal Maidenhood, a group who have all sworn an oath of virginity for all eternity, but is no longer a member, as she is no longer a virgin due to being raped by Apollo, and, in later chapters, has started dating Hades. She is also an intern at Underworld Corp working as a Shade Coordinator and is gradually revealed to be a fertility goddess, a rare goddess that has incredible abilities. At the beginning of the series she develops a crush on Hades, which eventually evolves into romantic and sexual attraction. Over time she enters into a relationship with him, and they eventually become engaged for a short period.  They then get married in a quick, private ceremony. They first met in the mortal realm when Hades was drunk and Persephone disguised herself as a butterfly.
Hades is the King of the Underworld, god of the dead and wealth, and husband to Persephone. He is the older brother of Zeus and Poseidon, depicted as a tall, muscular blue businessman with a lot of scars around his body and white hair. Hades is the CEO of Underworld Corp, a large corporation that manages the souls of the dead. The reviewer for Love in Panels! described Hades as "the ultimate sensitive emo guy." Unlike in traditional mythology, Hades is not related to Persephone; Smythe changed this to avoid a story about incest. It's revealed he and Hera had romantic feelings and a very close relationship with each other in their youth, before Zeus separated them by having Hades become King of the Underworld, and Hera his wife and Queen of the gods. Hades and Hera would soon start a very passionate, sexual affair with each other that would last centuries, which stemmed from Hera wanting revenge on Zeus for his adulterous behavior and Hades wanting sexual intimacy in general; they would eventually stop this in the 80s. Hades is a member of the Six Traitors Dynasty. At the beginning of the series develops a crush on Persephone, which eventually evolves into romantic and sexual attraction. After entering into a relationship with her, he eventually proposes to Persephone, which she happily accepts. They are briefly engaged, before they get married in a quick, intimate wedding ceremony. Hades and Persephone first met in the mortal realm when Hades was drunk and Persephone disguised herself as a butterfly. He forgot this encounter due to Demeter getting him even more drunk so that he'd forget he even met Persephone. He later finds out about Persephone being raped when he overhears Apollo desperately trying to convince Hephaestus he didn't do anything to her. As a result, Hades confronts Persephone about it, and she tearfully admits to him about the situation.
 Hera is the goddess of marriage and family, Queen of the gods, and Zeus' wife, depicted as a golden woman with long hair and a long scar across her stomach. She is constantly seen drinking or smoking and is unhappy in her marriage to Zeus. She and Hades originally had feelings and a close relationship with each other, before Zeus sent Hades to the Underworld to be the King and proposing to Hera to be both his wife and the Queen of the gods. Due to Zeus' numerous affairs, which motivated Hera to get back at him, she and Hades had an ongoing, passionate sexual affair that lasted centuries, until they ended it in the 80s. Despite this, Hades and Hera continued to be really close friends who only have a platonic love for one another. Although apprehensive at first, Hera sets up Persephone to work under Hades as a way to test them and kickstart a relationship between the two, eventually giving Hades her blessing to be a romantic suitor for Persephone. Hera is a member of the Six Traitors Dynasty; her involvement in the overthrowing of Kronos earned her the nickname of Golden Traitor by other titans. She has the ability to see visions. She finds about what Apollo did to Persephone when she has a vision regarding the ordeal, and later confronts about it. Wanting to help Persephone, Hera gets her son Hephaestus to hack into Apollo's smartphone and delete photos he took of Persephone during the rape. Hera in Lore Olympus is a feminist.
 Eros is the god of love, son of Aphrodite and Ares, and grandson of Zeus and Hera. He's a friend of Persephone and is one of the few gods who is aware of Persephone's rape. He is depicted as a tall, muscular magenta man who enthusiastically creates and supports relationships. Eros has seven younger siblings from his mother and is in a relationship with Psyche. He later gets married and becomes a father during the 10-year exile.
 Hecate is the goddess of witchcraft. She is presented as a blue woman with yellow eyes and short black hair. She is Hades right-hand woman. She is smart, sassy, materialistic, and loves chaos. 
 Zeus is the King of the gods and Hades' and Poseidon's youngest brother, depicted as a muscular purple businessman with long straight hair. Zeus is an adulterer who shows constant promiscuous behavior. He is stubborn, selfish, narcissistic, egotistical, and a bully. He is shown to overreact when things don't go his way; for example, he burned down Demeter's crops after she refused to continue hiding his lovers from Hera. However, despite his negative qualities, he still deeply cares for and loves his wife and both of his brothers. Zeus is a member of the Six Traitors Dynasty and the only one without a scar on his body.
 Apollo is the god of the sun, music, and prophecy, depicted as a dark purple, burly playboy who is interested in Persephone. He is shown to be very arrogant. He rapes her and believes that they are in a relationship and then tries to force her to become his wife, but she refuses. He is Artemis' twin brother. It is later revealed that he is one of Zeus' sons. It is implied that he wants to be with Persephone, not because he genuinely likes her, but because she is a fertility goddess that he can use to overthrow Zeus. 
 Artemis is the goddess of the hunt and a member of The Goddesses of Eternal Maidenhood. She is Persephone's best friend, roommate, and the twin sister of Apollo. Artemis is depicted as a feisty, dark purple tomboy who looks out for Persephone and is generally ignorant of her brother's bad personality traits. Though, she begins to question her brother after Persephone told her that she hates Apollo and he makes her miserable. It is revealed, later on, that she is the daughter of Zeus.
 Demeter is the goddess of the harvest and agriculture in the Mortal Realm, depicted as a tall, green woman with long purple hair and scars across her back. She is shown to be an overbearing, overprotective, controlling, and emotionally abusive mother towards Persephone, who is shown in flashbacks to give her daughter very little freedom in the mortal realm, and as a result of her parenting, Persephone has occasional nightmares, reflecting her trauma of Demeter's overbearing parenting, where Persephone is imprisoned in a greenhouse. Her overprotectiveness may be because shes afraid of her daughter getting hurt since she knows her daughter is a fertility goddess though this is something that she kept from her daughter. It's revealed she and Poseidon conceived a son together, who happens to be a horse. Demeter is a member of the Six Traitors Dynasty. She harbors a deep resentment towards Hades due to him voting against her and bribing Zeus to change his vote, stopping Demeter from becoming queen of the mortal realm, due to the volcanoes that he refused to give up. After confronting him about it and being insulted by him, she vowed that if Hades wanted anything from her, she would do whatever she could to prevent him from claiming it.
 Ares is the god of war, depicted as a muscular orange man with red eyes. He is the only son of both Zeus and Hera and the older brother of Hebe. He dated Aphrodite for centuries, but she eventually broke up with him and married Hephaestus. The two are the parents of both Eros and Storge. He also had a brief history with Persephone when they first met in the mortal realm, after being impaled on a tree trunk and Persephone both freed and unknowingly, healed him. Thus, making him suspect she was potentially a fertility goddess. He later ran into her again and tricked her into thinking he couldn't read and had her teach him. She later discovered his lies when she found his journal and, in a rage, called for her mother, resulting in Demeter beating him with a pitchfork. He has the ability to make people become enraged against their will.
 Poseidon is the King and god of the sea and the younger brother of Hades and the older brother for Zeus. He is shown to be an carefree, free-spirited, impulsive, muscular green man with long curly hair and a long scar across his left eye. Despite his dimwitted demeanor, he has his moments of wisdom. Poseidon also has a deep love and respect for both of his brothers. He is a member of the six traitors dynasty. It's implied he and his wife, Amphitrite, are happily in an open marriage together.
 Amphitrite is both the goddess and Queen of the sea; she's also the wife of Poseidon. She is a green sea nymph, with patterns around her face and has a long fish tail. She appears to have an active social life, going to nightclubs and engaging in queen-related activities with her really close friend Hera. It's implied she and Poseidon are happily in an open marriage together.
 Hermes is the god of speed and travel, depicted as a muscular red athlete. He was friends with Persephone before she came to Olympus and frequently hangs out at Artemis and Persephone's house. He is one of Hades' soul collectors at Underworld Corp. He loves three things, money, his Mother, Maia and annoying Apollo. 
 Aphrodite is the goddess of love and beauty and mother of Eros. She is depicted as a lavender woman. At one point, Zeus blamed his affairs on her, resulting in Hera forbidding both Aphrodite and Eros from using their powers on any of the other gods. Originally Ares and Aphrodite were in an open relationship for centuries; though she eventually breaks up with him, and marries Hephaestus. She loves her children and is protective of them. An example is when Aphrodite seduced Zeus and slept with him in order for Eros to avoid getting a cruel punishment after he committed an act of wrath.
 Psyche is a beautiful human from the Mortal Realm. She was originally a princess from an abusive household and who was to be wed to an elderly, wealthy merchant before Eros abducted her. She currently lives in Olympus, originally disguised as a purple nymph who served Aphrodite. Later, during a confrontation with Apollo, Eros discovers her in disguise, breaking Aphrodite's spell and officially reuniting the two. Rather than punishing her, due to her being disguised as a nymph to stay in Olympus, and for shooting Apollo with an arrow. Zeus has her drink ambrosia, which makes her immortal and turns her into the goddess of the soul, and she gains a set of purple wings; in exchange, she has to keep a close eye on Apollo.
 Hestia is the goddess of hearth and home. She is depicted as a curvy orange woman with long hair and a long scar on her left thigh. She is a member of the six traitors dynasty and is the founder of TGOEM, The Goddesses of Eternal Maidenhood which is a group designed for Goddesses to be virgins for all eternity. It is revealed she is in a relationship with Athena.
 Athena is the goddess of wisdom and warfare. She is depicted as a silver woman with short silver hair. She is a member of TGOEM, but she reveals to Artemis she is in a relationship with Hestia.
 Minthe is a scarlet red river nymph that lives in the Underworld. She is snarky, and has a very self-destructive personality and has low self-confidence in herself; part of this was a result of being raised by her neglectful mother growing up. At the beginning of the series, she is Hades' personal assistant and physically, verbally, and emotionally abusive girlfriend. After a violent outburst and assault on her part, also fueled by his growing feelings for Persephone, Hades breaks up with her. Persephone turns her into a mint plant for 3 years after finding out about her involvement with confiding in Zeus about her past. After being turned back into a nymph, Minthe matures and humbles over time and becomes a teacher to other nymphs in the mortal realm.
 Thanatos is the god of death, depicted as a young grey man with light blue eyes; he is also the son of the titan Nyx, brother of Hypnos, and uncle to Morpheus. Thanatos is insecure in his position as one of Hades' soul collectors due to his low productivity. He frequently hung out with Minthe and Thetis before realizing how toxic they were and becoming more and more miserable with their antics. After starting to get close to Daphne, he admits to the both of them he has no desire to associate with them anymore, and eventually begins to date Daphne. It's revealed he views Hades as a father-figure, having been abandoned by his mother and sent to work for and be taken care of by Hades as a child. 
 Eris is the goddess of discord. She is presented as a bald woman with yellow skin and black wings and a big scar in the centre of her chest. She was the first child of Hera and Zeus but they disowned her. She gifted Persephone wrath when she was an infant.
 Hephaestus is the god of fire and metalworking. He is depicted as a dark orange man with yellow eyes, a buzzcut, glasses and prosthetic legs and a robotic left arm. He is shown to be a computer hacker and inventor. He has an intelligent AI named, Aetna. He is aware of what Apollo did to Persephone, as his mother, Hera, requested that he hack into Apollo's smartphone and delete photos that were taken during the rape. It's also revealed he maintains his distance from Olympus, as he's not too close to his relatives. The only two family members he seems to have positive relationships with are his mother, Hera, and his uncle Hades. He eventually marries Aphrodite.
 Thetis is a grey and turquoise sea nymph. She is a manipulative woman and is Minthe's former toxic best friend. She originally was Zeus' personal secretary, and one of his mistresses. She wanted him to leave Hera for her. She later becomes a queen when Zeus banished both her and Thanatos from Olympus, and he married her off to Peleus. Together, both she and the king have a son named Achilles.
 Echo is a dark blue nymph with short hair. She was hired by Zeus to be Hera's new personal secretary. She is Daphne's roommate and friend. 
 Daphne is a pink and blue flower nymph. Daphne is a friend of Persephone's from the mortal realm. She previously dated Apollo, but after an uncomfortable date with Apollo, she ditches him, and eventually enters into a relationship with Thanatos. She is Echo's roommate and friend. Similar to Eros, Psyche, Hera, Hephaestus, and Hades, she also knows about Apollo having raped Persephone after Psyche shot Apollo with the arrow of hate and she saw his true intentions, horrifying her. After finding out, she was chased by Apollo, and prayed to her father Peneus, a river god, to turn her into a tree in order to avoid being killed by Apollo. She remained a tree for many years, but was eventually turned back into a flower nymph by Persephone during the 10 year exile. She was reunited with Thanatos in the mortal realm, due to him being banished there by Zeus.
 Leto is a titan and the goddess of motherhood. She is depicted as a yellow figure with black eyes who wears long veils that hide her mouth. She is the mother of the twins - Artemis and Apollo. She was once best friends with Hera, but after her affair with Zeus was revealed, their friendship was destroyed, and she was socially exiled from Olympus. However, after it is revealed Zeus fathered both Artemis and Apollo, during their initiation ceremony, Apollo requests to Zeus for Leto's exile to be lifted, to which Zeus grants.
 Kronos is the titan of time. He is depicted as a gigantic man with skin that looks like the night sky. He was a tyrannical leader and when Hades was six-years-old he swallowed his son and kept him imprisoned for thirteen years. Hades and Poseidon were eventually saved by Zeus and Kronos was eventually imprisoned in Tartarus. This event is still traumatizing for Hades. Kronos nearly escaped Tartarus when he was able to put all of the scarred traitors into long comas, and was able to possess the bodies of people in the Underworld, including Hermes, Hecate, and Hades. His plans were thwarted when Persephone ate from the pomegranate tree, became queen of the Underworld, and defeated him in combat.
 Metis is the titan of wisdom. She is depicted as a giant orange women with wings. She was a fertility goddess and because of her incredible abilities she was consumed by Zeus so he could overthrow Kronos. She is the mother of Hera, Hestia and Demeter. She reveals to both Persphone and Hades that she turned herself into a star, as she was about to be consumed by Zeus. She also had an intimate relationship with him.
 Nyx is the primordial goddess of the night. She is depicted as a giant dark blue woman with multiple hot pink eyes. She is the mother of both Thanatos and Hypnos, and grandmother of Morpheus. 
 Chiron is an orange centaur who wears glasses. She's Persephone's therapist.
 Rhea is the titan of motherhood and serenity. She is presented as a giant magenta woman. She was the mother of Hades, Poseidon and Zeus. She was a fertility goddess and because of her abilities she was used by Kronos so he could overthrow Ouranos. It is reveled that she died in Zeus' arms.
 Leuce is a pink nymph, she was presented as an offering, by Zeus, during negotiations with Hades as an alternative bride for Persephone. Hades angrily refused in response.
 Morpheus is the goddess of dreams. She is depicted as a blue woman with black hair and wings on her head. She's the daughter of Hypnos, niece to Thanatos, and granddaughter of Nyx. She is transgender. 
 Hypnos is the god of sleep. He is Thanatos' twin brother, father to Morpheus, and son of Nyx. He is presented as a nude grey man with blue eyes and wings, similar to Thanatos' look.
 Cerberus is one of Hades' dogs. He is a giant, black greyhound who has the ability to change from being a normal-sized dog to a giant-sized dog with three heads. He is close to Persephone and is able to verbally communicate with Hades. 
 Hebe is the goddess of youth. She is the youngest daughter of Zeus and Hera. She also has the ability to concoct numerous types of alcoholic beverages. She is presented as a yellow girl with long hair. 
 Helios is the titan of the sun. He is presented as a giant golden man. He told Thanatos about Persephone's wrathful event.
 Asclepius is a demigod and son of Apollo. He is the god of medicine and works as a physician. Asclepius is presented as a light purple, bald man. He is known to confide others private matters to his father, most likely as a result of Apollo forcing him to do so; for example, telling Apollo about Hades' sterility.
 Gaia is the primordial goddess of the earth. Gaia is presented as a giant turqoise woman with hair that looks like leaves. She was the first fertility goddess.  
 Ouranos' is the primordial god of the sky. He is presented as a giant, muscular sky-blue man, who has six eyes. 

The characters in Lore Olympus are each defined by a particular color. According to columnist Nahlia Bonfiglo, "Hades is depicted in dark colors—blues, purples, and blacks—that match his setting. The underworld is likewise illustrated in dark hues, making Persephone and all of her bold, bright colors pop even more."

 Publication 
The webcomic updates weekly on Webtoon, and readers with the "Webtoon Fast Pass" can access pages earlier. As of August 2022, over 200 episodes have been published, and Smythe said that she had an ending in mind for the series.

Smythe creates Lore Olympus using Adobe Photoshop and a Wacom Cintiq Pro drawing tablet.

On November 2 2021, both hardcover and trade paperback versions consisting of chapters 1-25 of the webcomic were published by Del Rey Books. Volume 2, which contains chapters 26-49, was released July 5, 2022. Volume 3, which contains chapters 50-75, was released October 11, 2022. Volume 4, which contains chapters 76-102, is set to be released June 6, 2023. 

 Influences 
On her website for Lore Olympus, Smythe lists some of the sources that she uses for the comic:Heroes, Gods and Monsters of the Greek Myths by Bernard Evslin;Classical Mythology: The Greeks: The Modern Scholar by Professor Peter Meineck;Classical Mythology by Professor Elizabeth Vandiver;
The Metamorphoses by Ovid;The Greek Myths by Robert Graves;The Works and Days by Hesiod;
The Iliad by Homer;
The Odyssey by Homer; 
The Homeric Hymns, specifically the Hymn to Demeter.

 Reception 
In 2019, Webtoon announced that Lore Olympus had been viewed over 299 million times, making it the most viewed webcomic on the platform. As of September 2021, Lore Olympus is the most popular webtoon on the platform, with over 5.4 million subscribers.

In an article for The Daily Dot, columnist Nahila Bonfiglio recommended the webcomic, saying: "There are many reasons to read Lore Olympus, but the simplest is to see Smythe's brilliant take on the myth. Her story is flawlessly enthralling, heartwarming, and painful. The characters confront timeless issues through a modern lens, breaking down the romanticization of rape and abduction with grace and intrigue. Smythe updates the series every Sunday, and new readers will find themselves awaiting that notification with bated breath." Bonfiglio also praised the art, saying: "[Smythe's] captivating way of telling her tale often involves carefully considered colors, panels completely without words and even—sometimes—music."The Beat declared Lore Olympus to be one of the 100 best comics of the 2010s, describing Smythe's art as "breathtaking" and making good use of the webtoon format, and saying that the modern setting made the story "feel as fresh and urgent as eavesdropping on your (very wealthy, very messy) neighbors."Critical Darlings reviewer Kaitlin Konecke said that "the drawings allow us to see how Persephone feels. It's a visceral way to tell a story, with graphics allowing us to see inside the mind of Persephone and convey the complicated array of emotions that follow a trauma such as sexual assault and rape." Konecke also praised the depiction of assault from a female writer, saying that Smythe and others "are not just telling us, but showing us. And in doing so, they make women and survivors feel seen."

A reviewer for Love in Panels! praised the decision to give Persephone more agency than in the original story, saying that "it's that agency, her claiming of her own body and sexuality, that pulls me like a magnet to these tales." Nicole Mejias of Crunchyroll said that while the story is a "bit mature and dramatic," the suspense and romance between Hades and Persephone is gripping, while the "art is colorful and gorgeous."

 Television series 
In October 2019, Deadline reported that the Jim Henson Company had entered into a partnership with Webtoon to create an animated series based on Lore Olympus. The series was said to be shepherded by the executive director of television for Jim Henson Company, Ashley Griffis, its style was not yet determined, and nor was its platform announced. Other reports stated that the series would be aimed at young adults and expand the "unique perspective" of Smythe on Greek mythology in the comic. It was also unclear whether Smythe would be involved in the adaptation. 

Although in March 2021, it was claimed that the series would be the "first animated series based on a Webtoon comic", other Webtoons, such as Tower of God and The God of High School, have already received anime adaptations. In December 2021, Webtoon stated, in a press release, that the animated series was "currently in development". The same was repeated in press releases from Webtoon in July 2022 and October 2022.

 Author Lore Olympus is written and illustrated by New Zealander Rachel Smythe (aged ). Smythe graduated with a graphic design degree and sought to enter the creative industry without success, and went into marketing. Smythe learned about the Webtoon app in 2016 and began drawing Lore Olympus'' in April 2017.

References 

2018 comics debuts
2018 webcomic debuts
Classical mythology in comics
Comics about women
Fantasy comics
Greek and Roman deities in fiction
Greek underworld in popular culture
Harvey Award winners
New Zealand comics titles
Rape of Persephone
Romance comics
Webtoons
Works based on classical literature
Works based on Metamorphoses
Works based on the Iliad
Works based on the Odyssey